Tübingen Hauptbahnhof is the largest station in the university town of Tübingen and the district of Tübingen, and a transport hub in the German state of Baden-Württemberg.

Location 
The station is located south of the centre of the old town on the opposite side of the Neckar. It was originally built in open fields, that are now the southern Tübingen districts of Derendingen and Südstadt. In 1960 a bus station was established in the station forecourt (Europaplatz), which is now used by 34 bus routes daily, connecting the station to the entire city.

History
The line now forming the Plochingen–Immendingen railway, then called the Obere Neckarbahn (Upper Neckar Railway), was opened from Plochingen to Reutlingen in 1859. It was extended to Tübingen and Rottenburg am Neckar in 1861. The line was then further extended in several stages until 1870, when it finally reached Immendingen on the Black Forest Railway, connecting to Lake Constance. This provided the rail link to the capital of the former Kingdom of Württemberg for the then 8,000 residents of Tübingen and about 30,000 residents in the administrative district of Oberamt Tübingen that then included Tübingen. In 1861/1862, the still preserved station building was built to a design by the architect Josef Schlierholz. At the same time an engine depot was established in Tübingen. From 1867 to 1874, the Royal Württemberg State Railways built the Hohenzollern Railway (Hohenzollernbahn or Hohenzollern Railway, later called the Zollernalbbahn or Zollernalb Railway) from Tübingen via Hechingen to Sigmaringen, forming the Tübingen–Sigmaringen railway and making Tübingen into a railway junction. Once the Ammer Valley Railway from Herrenberg was connected to Tübingen on 1 May 1910, the present form of the rail junction was largely achieved. In 1916, an underpass was built to the two island platforms, the entrance building was extended to the west with the construction of the so-called exit hall, the interior of the entrance building was rebuilt and the platforms were covered. Apart from changes of use, in particular the conversion of waiting rooms and storage areas to shops and restaurants, and minor changes, such as the removal of the platform barriers, it is largely unchanged since then.

Air raid shelters were set up in the basement of the entrance building in 1937.

Current operations

Layout of the station 

The Tübingen Hauptbahnhof now has eight running lines, five of which are equipped with platforms: track 1 is the main platform track, the two island platforms are bordered by tracks 2/3 and 5/6. On the island platforms there are also the bay platforms 9–12, of which only 12 is used for passenger operations. At the western end of the main platform there is another bay platform, track 13. The former freight yard was to the west of the station, close to the engine depot and the Ammer Valley Railway, Zollernalb Railway and Upper Neckar Railway. Only a few of its tracks are still in use for stabling trains.

All tracks have LCD destination displays for passenger information. There is also a Deutsche Bahn service point and a travel centre. Two restaurants and various shops are available for visitors. The station also has a federal police station and a contact point of the Bahnhofsmission (a charity).

Tübingen Hauptbahnhof is not accessible for the handicapped, but DB Station&Service is implementing a development plan to overcome this problem during 2011 as part of the station modernisation program of Baden-Württemberg; work started in the spring of 2010. In the course of this work platforms will also be raised, circulation areas will be modernised and the infrastructure will be better aligned with operating requirements.

Services

Long distance services 
Until the new timetable in December 2009, there were no scheduled long-distance services to Tübingen. Since the timetable change in December 2009, Intercity trains have served Tübingen.

Regional services
The following Interregio-Express (IRE), Regional-Express (RE) and Regionalbahn (RB) services operate:

Prospects
After the planned completion of the Stuttgart 21 project, it is planned to operate four trains per hour each way between Stuttgart and Tübingen in 2020. Two pairs of trains per hour will stop in Nürtingen and Stuttgart Flughafen/Messe station, running via the proposed Little Wendlingen Curve and a section of the new Wendlingen–Ulm high-speed line. Two pairs of trains an hour will run via Plochingen. Diesel powered tilting trains will no longer run on the line, because they will be banned in the new Stuttgart Hauptbahnhof.

Services will operate via Stuttgart to Heilbronn, Mannheim, Aalen and Karlsruhe providing connections without requiring changes of trains.

The renovation of the Tübingen train station is considered by the Deutsche Bahn as a priority and will be carried out within the scope of the Europaplatz project. The administration developed the concept with DB and in close coordination with the preservation of historical monuments.

References

Railway stations in Baden-Württemberg
Buildings and structures in Tübingen
Romanesque Revival railway stations in Germany
Railway stations in Germany opened in 1862
19th-century establishments in Württemberg